Hupa traditional narratives include myths, legends, tales, and oral histories preserved by the Hupa, Chilula, and Whilkut people of the Trinity River basin and vicinity of northwestern California. The Hupa people of modern times number in the several thousands and live in the Hoopa Valley located in Humboldt County, California.

The oral literature of the Hupa is markedly similar to that of their linguistically unrelated neighbors, the Karuk and Yurok. It differs from the traditional narratives of most California groups, but shows stronger links with the Northwest Coast region of North America.

Sources
 Bushnell, John, and Donna Bushnell. 1977. "Wealth, Work and World View in Native Northwest California: Sacred Significance and Psychoanalytic Symbolism". In Flowers of the Wind: Papers on Ritual, Myth and Symbolism in California and the Southwest, edited by Thomas C. Blackburn, pp. 120–182. Ballena Press, Socorro, New Mexico. (Myths are used to illustrate themes concerning wealth, work, and emotion.)
 Curtis, Edward S. 1907-1930. The North American Indian. 20 vols. Plimpton Press, Norwood, Massachusetts. (Three myths collected from Jackson, vol. 13, pp. 183–185.)
 Gifford, Edward Winslow, and Gwendoline Harris Block. 1930. California Indian Nights. Arthur H. Clark, Glendale, California. (Four previously published narratives, pp. 112–117, 168-171, 194-196, 213-215.)
 Goddard, Pliny Earl. 1904. "Hupa Texts". University of California Publications in American Archaeology and Ethnology 1:89-368. Berkeley. (Legends and myths collected in 1901-1902.)
 Golla, Victor E. 1977. "Coyote and Frog (Hupa)". In Northern Californian Texts, edited by Victor Golla and Shirley Silver, pp. 17–25. International Journal of American Linguistics Native American Texts Series No. 2(2). University of Chicago Press.
 Golla, Victor E. 1984. Hupa Stories, Anecdotes, and Conversations. Hoopa Valley Tribe, Arcata, California.
 Goddard, Pliny Earl. 1914. "Chilula Texts". University of California Publications in American Archaeology and Ethnology 10:289-379. Berkeley. (Includes traditional narratives.)
 Kroeber, A. L. 1925. Handbook of the Indians of California. Bureau of American Ethnology Bulletin No. 78. Washington, D.C. (Creation myths, pp. 72–73, 134.)
 Luthin, Herbert W. 2002. Surviving through the Days: A California Indian Reader. University of California Press, Berkeley. (Three traditional narratives from Golla 1984, pp. 104–114.)
 Margolin, Malcolm. 1993. The Way We Lived: California Indian Stories, Songs, and Reminiscences. First edition 1981. Heyday Books, Berkeley, California. (Three narratives, pp. 89, 130-135, from Goddard 1904.)
 Powers, Stephen. 1877. Tribes of California. Contributions to North American Ethnology, vol. 3. Government Printing Office, Washington, D.C. Reprinted with an introduction by Robert F. Heizer in 1976, University of California Press, Berkeley. (One myth, pp. 80–81.)
 Thompson, Stith. 1929. Tales of the North American Indians. Harvard University Press, Cambridge, Massachusetts. (Dug-from-Ground myth, pp. 97–100, from Goddard 1904.)
 Wallace, William J. 1948. "Hupa Narrative Tales". Journal of American Folklore 61:345-355. (Collected in 1945-1946; mostly relating to the historic period, but with some legends.)

External links
 "The Northern California Indians" by Stephen Powers (1872)
 "Hupa Texts" by Pliny Earl Goddard (1904)
 The North American Indian by Edward S. Curtis (1924)

Hupa
Traditional narratives (Native California)